Kurwai is a town and a Nagar Panchayat in Vidisha district in the Indian state of Madhya Pradesh.

History
The town of Kurwai was founded by mohm. Diler khan in 1715 of Kurwai State

Kurwai was formerly a Muslim princely state of British India. The state was 368 km² in area and in 1892 boasted a population of 30,631. The state, which came under British sovereignty in the early nineteenth century, was founded in 1713 by Mohammed Diler Khan, an Afghan pashtun from the Orakzai tribe rising through merit in the Mughal Army. Diler Khan was a cousin of Dost Muhammad Khan, who founded the nearby Bhopal State. His descendants ruled the state until 15 June 1948, when the last ruling Nawab acceded to the Indian Government. Kurwai became part of the newly created state of Madhya Bharat, and was added to Vidisha District. Madhya Bharat was merged into Madhya Pradesh on 1 November 1956.

Demographics
 India census, Kurwai had a population of 13,737. Males constitute 52% of the population and females 48%. Kurwai has an average literacy rate of 61%, higher than the national average of 59.5%: male literacy is 69%, and female literacy is 53%. In Kurwai, 18% of the population is under 6 years of age.

Transport 
The nearest airport is Bhopal.

Nearest Railway Station Is Mandi Bamora And Nearby Junction Is Bina

References

External links
Audio with Princess Abida Sultaan of Bhopal

Cities and towns in Vidisha district